Geng Bingwa  (born January 3, 1994) is a Chinese figure skater. She won the silver medal in 2008 and 2011 at the Chinese Figure Skating Championships, and reached the free skate at five International Skating Union Championships.

Personal life 
Geng was born in Qiqihar, Heilongjiang. Her mother coaches figure skating and father formerly competed in ice hockey. Her name "Bingwa" means "ice baby" in Chinese.

In February 2011, Geng's age became the subject of controversy. Although her International Skating Union biography states she was born on January 3, 1994, a Chinese website suggests she was born on March 3, 1995.

Career 
Geng began skating at the age in 1998. Her international debut came at the 2008 World Junior Championships in Sofia, Bulgaria. Ranked 24th in the short program, she qualified for the free skate (17th) and finished 21st overall. The following season, she made her first and only appearance on the International Skating Union Junior Grand Prix series, placing 8th in Mexico. At the 2008 World Junior Championships, she placed 11th in the short, 21st in the free, and 18th overall.

Making her Grand Prix debut, Geng finished 11th at the 2009 Cup of China. The following season, she placed fifth at the 2010 Cup of China, 13th at the 2011 Four Continents Championships in Taipei, and 18th at the 2011 World Championships in Moscow.

Geng ranked 11th at the 2012 Four Continents in Colorado Springs, Colorado. She withdrew from the 2012 Cup of China after the short program and has made no international appearances since that event.

Programs

Competitive highlights
GP: Grand Prix; JGP: Junior Grand Prix

Detailed results

References

References

 

1994 births
Living people
Chinese female single skaters
Sportspeople from Qiqihar
Figure skaters at the 2011 Asian Winter Games
Figure skaters from Heilongjiang